Eseohe Arhebamen or Eseohe Arhebamen-Yamasaki, also known as Edoheart (born Obehioye Eseohe Ikhianose Oghomwenyenmwen Cleopatra Anne Arhebamen), is a poet, dancer, singer, musician, producer, performance artist and visual artist. Eseohe was born in Zaria, Nigeria and is descended from a royal family of the Benin Empire. Eseohe Arhebamen's maternal grandmother is Princess Theresa Maria Nodumwenben Osazuwa, a princess of the Edo people. Eseohe Arhebamen's great-grandfather Osazuwa Eredia, the father of Princess Theresa Osazuwa, was the Oba N’Ugu and Enogie of Umoghumwun, making Eseohe Arhebamen a royal descendant and princess. "The foundation of the kingdom of Ugu, with its capital at Umoghumwun has been traced to Prince Idu, the eldest son of Oba Eweka I."

Early life 

Eseohe Arhebamen is the oldest of five siblings and frequently played a parental role in their upbringing. At the age of seven Eseohe's family migrated to the United States and settled in Detroit, Michigan. At age 17 she enrolled in the University of Michigan at the Residential College. Although strongly encouraged to pursue medicine as a career path, Eseohe instead followed her passion for poetry, language and the arts. As an undergraduate student Eseohe focused on literary means and performance as a way to affect social change. While at the University of Michigan, Eseohe won prestigious awards for her writing and is included in a University of Michigan Anthology of Hopwood Award winners.

Career 

At 19 years old, Eseohe earned a position as Writer-in-Residence with InsideOut Literary Arts in Detroit, Michigan and worked with children in impoverished inner-city schools to expand their literary skills. After moving to New York in 2003, Eseohe founded the company EdoHeart also written as Edoheart which became her performance name. Eseohe Arhebamen is synonymous with Edoheart.

Eseohe received a Bachelor of Arts from the University of Michigan in Creative Writing and Literature in August, 2005, and went on to receive another Bachelor of Arts in Studio Art with a minor in English from Hunter College. She further graduated from New York University with a Master's degree in Performance Studies, which is described as drawing from a study of the performing arts, anthropology and sociology, literary theory, and legal studies. Eseohe also intensively studied Butoh dance with Yukio Waguri.

Areas of interest in Eseohe Arhebamen's experimental work are imaginative creation of alternate environments, and poetry and vocal expressions as a source for movement. She has choreographed and taught or led workshops involving these areas of interest at The Living Theatre and Columbia University's Teacher's College. Eseohe Arhebamen has appeared on Korean and American television and news, and in American, Estonian and Latvian newspapers. In 2011, she was chosen by artist Kalup Linzy to appear in a documentary about New York artists. Eseohe Arhebamen also appears in a video tape included in acclaimed poet Anne Waldman's papers purchased by the University of Michigan Special Collections Library.

Butoh vocal theatre 

Eseohe Arhebamen is the first indigenous and native-born African butoh performer. In addition, Eseohe Arhebamen is the first performer to combine butoh dance with singing, talking, mudra, sign language, spoken word, and experimental vocalizations after the traditional dance styles of the Edo people of West Africa. She refers to this dance style as Butoh-Vocal Theatre. Eseohe Arhebamen's Butoh-Vocal Theatre style arises out of her work in poetry, music and the traditional Edo theater in which performers dance and sing simultaneously, and is influenced by her expressed belief in a common lingual history between the Edo people of Nigeria and the Japanese. On 26 September 2010 Eseohe gave a performance at a Yukio Waguri intensive workshop demonstrating her style of Butoh-Vocal Theatre during which she danced butoh while singing Pure Imagination from Willy Wonka & the Chocolate Factory.

Eseohe's notable performance during the Fifth Diverse Universe tour was described by Kaarel Kressa as embodying natural elegance and femininity; with poetry, dance and song that won the hearts of the audience. Eseohe's performances have also been called "powerful ritual".

Marriage 

In 2006, Eseohe married long time sweetheart Seth Yamasaki, son of Pulitzer Prize winning photographer Taro Yamasaki, and grandson of Minoru Yamasaki, Japanese-American architect best known for designing the World Trade Center. The two live in Brooklyn, New York.

Poetry books 

 2010: Poems 1998-2009 (Laughing Mouse Press)
 2003: Seeding the Clouds (Ornithology Press)

Discography 

 2019: Okada 8000 (Edoheart & Nick Hook)
 2019: 1H (Edoheart)
 2018: Raw Cash Remix (Edoheart)
 2018: Na Fiya Ft. Masterkraft (Edoheart)
 2017: Majokko Olokun (Edoheart)
 2013: Edoheart – Sosomoneycockplease EP (Akwaaba Music)
 2012: Get As E Be - EP (Edoheart)
 2010: Shchedryk Avant Remix (Clinical Archives)
 2010: Monsoon in Ibadan (Clinical Archives)
 2010: Wa Domo Edo (Edoheart)
 2009: The Hunger Artist (Eseohe)

Film and video 
 "I'm That African" (2019) 
 "Raw Cash Remix" (2018) 
 "I No Send" (2018) 
 "Na Fiya Ft. Masterkraft" (2018) 
 "Sugar In A Plum" (2012) 
 "Fire Butoh 4!" (2011) 
 "Sometimes (Take me away)" (2011)
 "Sosomoneycockplease (Video edit)" (2010)
 "Excerpt of Fire Butoh 3 for the Low Lives Exhibition" (2010)
 "Blue Butterfly Butoh" (2009)
 "The Cement Factory" (2009)
 "#18 / Number 18" (2009)
 "eAir Butoh Sketch" (2009)
 "Fire Butoh 3 Visuals" (2008)
 "Fire Butoh 3" (2008)
 "Fire Butoh 2" (2008)
 "Es Su Casa" (2008)
 "Fire Butoh 1" (2007) 
 The N Word (2007)

Anthologies and catalogues 

 2009: Diverse Universe Festival 2005–2009, Academia Gustaviana Selts Mty
 2009: Low Lives, Jorge Rojas
 2009: Kunsti Aastaraamat, Parnu Linnavalitsuse kultuuriosakond (Cultural Department of Parnu City Government), Printon Printing House
 2009: 세계 실험예술의 메카, 홍대 앞 - 인터넷서점 인터파크도서
 2006: The Hopwood Awards: 75 Years of Prized Writing, University of Michigan Press
 2006: The New Spend Less Revolution, Harriman House

Awards 

 2012: Tisch School of the Arts Department Sponsored Tuition Award, New York University 
 2006: Poet of the Day, Poets Against the War
 2002: Environmental Justice Initiative First Place Award, University of Michigan
 2002: College Unions Poetry Slam Invitational National Champion First Place, University of Michigan Team
 2000: Writer-in-Residence, InsideOut Literary/Arts Project
 2000: Arthur Miller Award (Fiction)
 2000: Jeffrey L. Weisberg Memorial Prize in Poetry
 2000: Hopwood Minor Poetry Award
 2000: Hopwood Underclassmen Fiction Award
 1998: Residential College Fellowship, University of Michigan

References

External links 
 Official Homepage
 Edoheart - Teaching: Classes & Workshops
 Edoheart Official links

Living people
1981 births
Nigerian women poets
21st-century Nigerian women singers
Musicians from Edo State
University of Michigan College of Literature, Science, and the Arts alumni
Butoh
Nigerian artists
People from Zaria
Edo people
21st-century Nigerian poets
21st-century Nigerian women writers